

Codes

References

C